Michael Fatialofa (born 14 September 1992) is a New Zealand rugby union player who currently plays as a lock for Worcester Warriors in the Premiership.

Early career

Born in Auckland, Fatialofa was educated at Mount Albert Grammar School in his hometown where he played first XV rugby for 3 years and helped them to lift the Auckland Schools title in 2010.   Rated as one of the top New Zealand lock prospects at the time, it came as something of a surprise when he opted to move to the country's far south to play club rugby with the Blues in Southland after he'd finished high school.

Senior career

His first season with the Stags saw him play 3 times as they were relegated from the ITM Cup Premiership. In 2013 and 2014, he was a key figure in Southland's line up, playing all 22 matches across both seasons.

He moved back home to  ahead of the 2015 ITM Cup with the switch seeing him join one of New Zealand's traditional rugby powerhouses.

2016 would not be such a happy year for Auckland as they finished up 5th on the Premiership log, missing out on the playoffs altogether, Fatialofa himself played in 8 of their 10 matches during the season.

Four years of toil with Southland and an impressive season with Auckland saw him finally earn a Super Rugby contract with the Wellington-based  ahead of the 2016 Super Rugby season. Fatialofa played 15 times during his debut Super Rugby campaign.

On 28 March 2018, Fatialofa signed for England club Worcester Warriors in the Aviva Premiership on a two-year contract from the 2018-19 season. On 4 January 2020 he suffered a serious neck injury in a match against Saracens. He underwent surgery, and left intensive care on 23 January after which he was told to prepare for life in a wheelchair. In fact he was able to walk unaided by 21 March 2020; a recovery his wife described as miraculous: "proof that God is never limited to human wisdom."

International career

He was a New Zealand Schools representative in 2010.

On 5 November 2016, he featured for the Barbarians in their 31-31 draw against  at Wembley Stadium.   He played the entire 80 minutes in the number 5 jersey in a side containing his Hurricanes team-mates, Reggie Goodes and Brad Shields.

Career Honours

Hurricanes

Super Rugby - 2016

Super Rugby Statistics

Personal life

Fatialofa is a committed Christian.  He is married to Tatiana: he and his wife attend Freedom Church in Worcester.

References

1992 births
Living people
New Zealand rugby union players
Rugby union locks
Auckland rugby union players
Southland rugby union players
People educated at Mount Albert Grammar School
Rugby union players from Auckland
Hurricanes (rugby union) players
Barbarian F.C. players